The 1984 United States presidential election in Kentucky took place on November 6, 1984. All 50 states and the District of Columbia, were part of the 1984 United States presidential election. Kentucky voters chose nine electors to the Electoral College, which selected the president and vice president of the United States.

Kentucky was won by the Republican ticket of incumbent President Ronald Reagan of California and Vice President George H. W. Bush of Texas by a 20 point margin over Democratic ticket of former Vice President Walter Mondale of Minnesota and his running mate Representative Geraldine Ferraro of New York. Ferraro was the first major female candidate for the vice presidency.

The presidential election of 1984 was a very partisan election for Kentucky, with over 99% of the electorate voting either Democratic or Republican, though several other parties did appear on the ballot. Reagan carried 100 of Kentucky's counties; Mondale carried 19, mostly in the Eastern Kentucky Coalfield. One county–Gallatin County–split its two-party vote exactly evenly between the two nominees, with each receiving 1,042 votes.

Reagan became the first Republican to ever carry Carroll County, a highly secessionist rural Bluegrass county that had been the state's only county outside the coalfields to support George McGovern 12 years earlier. Kentucky weighed in for this election as 2 percentage points more Republican than the national average.

Reagan won Kentucky by 20.7%, a landslide margin slightly greater than his national margin, and a dramatic shift with respect to 1980, when Reagan only narrowly carried the state over the Southern Democrat Jimmy Carter by 1.5%. Mondale performed well in the Eastern Kentucky Coalfield, but relatively poorly in other traditionally Democratic areas of the state, such as the Bluegrass, the Jackson Purchase, and the Western Kentucky Coalfield, relative even to previous national landslide losers such as Adlai Stevenson in 1952 and 1956, John Davis in 1924, and James Cox in 1920. In the Western Coalfield, Reagan became only the second Republican (after Nixon in 1972) to carry Henderson County since 1928, and to ever carry Hopkins County. In the Bluegrass, Reagan became the second Republican, again after only Nixon in 1972, ever to carry Owen County, Henry County, Trimble County, Harrison County, and Franklin County, and the second since 1928 (after Nixon in 1972) to carry Shelby County, Bourbon County, Nicholas County, and Bath County. Concomitantly, Reagan became only the second Republican, after Nixon in 1972, to get over 60% of the vote in the Bluegrass State, a feat which would be replicated in 2012, 2016, and 2020.

Democratic platform
Walter Mondale accepted the Democratic nomination for presidency after pulling narrowly ahead of Senator Gary Hart of Colorado and Rev. Jesse Jackson of Illinois - his main contenders during what would be a very contentious Democratic primary. During the campaign, Mondale was vocal about reduction of government spending, and, in particular, was vocal against heightened military spending on the nuclear arms race against the Soviet Union, which was reaching its peak on both sides in the early 1980s.

Taking a (what was becoming the traditional liberal) stance on the social issues of the day, Mondale advocated for gun control, the right to choose regarding abortion, and strongly opposed the repeal of laws regarding institutionalized prayer in public schools. He also criticized Reagan for his economic marginalization of the poor, stating that Reagan's reelection campaign was "a happy talk campaign," not focused on the real issues at hand.

The Democratic Party nominated Representative Geraldine Ferraro as its vice presidential nominee, making her the first female candidate ever on a major party's presidential ticket. Ferraro, said in an interview during the 1984 Democratic National Convention that this action "opened a door which will never be closed again."

Republican platform

By 1984, Reagan was very popular with voters across the nation for seeing the country out of the economic stagflation of the early and middle 1970s, and into a period of relative economic stability.

The economic success seen under Reagan has been generally attributed to the deep tax cuts he implemented for the wealthy and corporations, including a wide-spectrum of tax reforms for crude oil production and refinement, namely, with the 1980 Windfall profits tax cuts. These policies were augmented with a call for heightened military spending, the cutting of social welfare programs for the poor, and the increasing of taxes on those making less than $50,000 per year. Collectively called "Reaganomics", these economic policies were established through several pieces of legislation passed between 1980 and 1987.

Reaganomics is generally remembered for its trickle down effect of taxing poor Americans more than rich ones, and (along with similar legislation passed under presidents George H. W. Bush and Bill Clinton) has been criticized by many analysts as "setting the stage" for economic troubles in the United States after 2007, such as the Great Recession.

Virtually unopposed during the Republican primaries, Reagan ran on a campaign of furthering his economic policies. Reagan vowed to continue his "war on drugs," passing sweeping legislation after the 1984 election in support of mandatory minimum sentences for drug possession.  He advanced socially conservative policies, strongly opposing legislation protecting gay marriage, the right to abortion, and the environment, in the name of protecting business interests.

Results

Results by county

See also
 Presidency of Ronald Reagan

References

Kentucky
1984
1984 Kentucky elections